The 1911–12 NC State Wolfpack men's basketball team represents North Carolina State University during the 1911–12 college men's basketball season. The Head coach was Piggy Hargrove coaching the team in his second season.

Schedule

References

NC State Wolfpack men's basketball seasons
NC State
NC State Wolf
NC State Wolf